Nysted is an unincorporated community in Howard County, Nebraska, United States.

History
Nysted was founded in 1883. A majority of the early settlers being natives of Denmark caused the name Nysted to be selected.

A post office was established at Nysted in 1883, and remained in operation until it was discontinued in 1918.

References

Danish-American culture in Nebraska
Unincorporated communities in Howard County, Nebraska
Unincorporated communities in Nebraska
Populated places established in 1883
1883 establishments in Nebraska